The Illinois Railway , formerly Illinois Railnet, is a shortline railroad operating in Northern Illinois owned by OmniTRAX. It operates  of former BNSF Railway trackage. It was created in 1997 and operates four lines in Northern Illinois.

Lines

Trackage rights 
 Montgomery to Eola
 Power only Oregon to Aurora
 Power only Zearing to Montgomery

Locomotives

Former Locomotives

References 

Illinois railroads
OmniTRAX